A statue of Francisco I. Madero is installed in Guadalajara's Parque Revolución, in the Mexican state of Jalisco. The statue was vandalized during the 2020 International Women's Day march.

References

External links

 

Monuments and memorials in Jalisco
Outdoor sculptures in Guadalajara
Sculptures of men in Mexico
Statues in Jalisco
Vandalized works of art in Mexico